La Cruz is a town and municipality in the Nariño Department, Colombia.

References

Municipalities of Nariño Department